Hugh Carroll Frazer (February 22, 1891 – July 9, 1975) was born in the Martinsburg, West Virginia. He graduated from the United States Naval Academy in 1912. He received the Medal of Honor for actions at the United States occupation of Veracruz, 1914. Frazer was also a veteran of World War I and World War II.

Medal of Honor citation
Rank and organization: Ensign
Organization: U.S. Navy
Born:Martinsburg, W. Va.
Entered service at: West Virginia
Place/Date: Vera Cruz, Mexico, 22 April 1914
Date of issue: 12/04/1915

Citation:

For extraordinary heroism in battle, engagement of Vera Cruz, 22 April 1914. During this engagement, Ens. Frazer ran forward to rescue a wounded man, exposing himself to hostile fire and that of his own men. Having accomplished the mission, he returned at once to his position in line.

See also

List of Medal of Honor recipients (Veracruz)
List of United States Naval Academy alumni (Medal of Honor)

References

External links

1891 births
1975 deaths
Burials at Arlington National Cemetery
United States Navy Medal of Honor recipients
United States Naval Academy alumni
Military personnel from Martinsburg, West Virginia
United States Navy personnel of World War I
United States Navy personnel of World War II
United States Navy officers
Battle of Veracruz (1914) recipients of the Medal of Honor